"Beaucoups of Blues" is the title song from Ringo Starr's 1970 country album of the same name. It was released as Starr's first solo single on 5 October 1970 on Apple in several countries, but not the UK, and entered the charts in both the US and Germany where it reached number 87 and number 43 respectively. The song was written by Nashville singer-songwriter Buzz Rabin, and appeared on his 1974 solo album Cross Country Cowboy.

Starr recorded "Beaucoups of Blues" in Nashville during an overnight session on 25–26 June 1970. He selected it from material compiled by Pete Drake, his producer, who had amassed a collection of potential songs from Nashville songwriters for Starr's country album.

Cash Box described the song as a "fine country single," further stating that it is "gentle and easy going and Ringo sounds right at home."

The song was later included on Starr's greatest hits albums Blast from Your Past and Photograph: The Very Best of Ringo Starr. In 2015, it was included on the album Dylan, Cash, and the Nashville Cats: A New Music City, released to accompany the similarly titled exhibition at the Country Music Hall of Fame.

References
 Footnotes

 Citations

Ringo Starr songs
Apple Records singles
1970 debut singles
Music published by Startling Music
1970 songs